The  was an infantry division of the Imperial Japanese Army. It was formed on 2 April 1945 in Utsunomiya as a triangular division. It was one of a batch of eight divisions composed of the 201st, 202nd, 205th, 206th, 209th, 212th, 214th and 216th Divisions created as part of the reaction to the Battle of Okinawa.

History
On 19 June 1945, the 214th Division organization and deployment was complete. The 519th Infantry Regiment was in Utsunomiya, 520th - in Yaita, and 521st infantry regiment - in Setagaya. Other smaller sub-units were stationed at Nasushiobara. The 214th division was assigned to the army mobile reserve and did not see any combat by the time of the surrender of Japan on 15 August 1945.

See also
 List of Japanese Infantry Divisions

Notes and references
This article incorporates material from Japanese Wikipedia page 第214師団 (日本軍), accessed 20 July 2016
 Madej, W. Victor, Japanese Armed Forces Order of Battle, 1937–1945 [2 vols], Allentown, PA: 1981.

Japanese World War II divisions
Infantry divisions of Japan
Military units and formations established in 1945
Military units and formations disestablished in 1945
1945 establishments in Japan
1945 disestablishments in Japan